Chu Han Zhengxiong is a Chinese television series directed by Chen Jialin. The plot, based on the historical novel of the same Chinese title by Xiong Cheng (熊誠), retells the events in the Chu–Han Contention, an interregnum between the fall of the Qin dynasty and the founding of the Han dynasty. Shooting for the series started in October 2011 at the Jiaozuo Film and Television City. It was released in China on 27 November 2012.

Cast

 Ren Chengwei as Xiang Yu
 Anthony Wong as Liu Bang
 Gina Jin as Consort Yu
 Ke Lan as Lü Zhi
 Yao Gang as Han Xin
 Ma Xiaowei as Zhang Liang
 Chen Rui as Xiao He
 Xu Min as Fan Zeng
 Li Bo as Chen Ping
 Zhong Weihua as Xiang Bo
 Yan Jie as Xiang Zhuang
 Zheng Shiming as Ying Bu
 Ni Tu as Long Ju
 Jiang Nan as Ji Bu
 Ying Jun as Zhongli Mo
 Yang Fengyu as Yu Ziqi
 Han Dong as Fan Kuai
 Duan Weiping as Xiahou Ying
 Zhang Jinhe as Yong Chi
 Han Xiao as Cao Shen
 Wang Yansu as Concubine Qi
 Wu Ma as Huang Shigong
 Li Yeqing as Qin E
 Guan Huiqing as Yun'er
 Kou Shixun as Qin Shi Huang
 Guo Kaimin as Li Si
 Shi Xiaoman as Zhao Gao

External links

2012 Chinese television series debuts
Television series set in the Western Han dynasty
Television series set in the Qin dynasty
Chinese historical television series